The 2014–15 season of Flamengo Basketball is the 95th season of the club, and the club's 7th in the Novo Basquete Brasil (NBB).

Flamengo will played all NBB regular season games in Ginásio Álvaro Vieira Lima.

Off-season
The NBB defending champions started planning for the 2014-15 season with the signing of the former 2004 Summer Olympics gold medalist veteran Argentinian small forward Walter Herrmann, on July 24, 2014.

On August 14, 2014 NBA officially confirmed that Flamengo would be playing against Phoenix Suns, Orlando Magic and Memphis Grizzlies in the 2014-15 pre-season games. This will be the first time a South American basketball team plays against an NBA team in a pre-season game, as well as the first in North American soil.

In preparation to play 2014 FIBA Intercontinental Cup, 2015 FIBA Americas League and the 2014–15 NBB Flamengo re-signed Vítor Benite, Gegê Chaia, Olivinha, Jerome Meyinsse and one of the team stars Nicolás Laprovíttola, in order to keep the 2013-14 team base to the next season.

On September 23, 2014 the club signed former Los Angeles Lakers center Derrick Caracter, initially to be member the team's roster only for the 2014 FIBA Intercontinental Cup and the NBA pre-season tour.

The season
The season started with the club winning FIBA Intercontinental Cup over Maccabi Tel Aviv, on aggregate, on a two-game series. Both games were played at HSBC Arena on September 26 and 28 and the Argentine Nicolás Laprovíttola were selected the competition MVP.

Roster

 (LDB) On assignment to LBD team

Transactions

In

|}

Out

|}

Pre-season games

Friendly

Pre-season USA tour

 * First Brazilian team to play against an NBA team on North American soil.

Competitions

Rio de Janeiro State Championship

2014 FIBA Intercontinental Cup

2014-15 NBB

Regular season standings

Regular season games

Playoffs

Quarterfinals

(3) Flamengo vs. (11) São José
Game 1

Game 2

Game 3

Game 4

Game 5

Semifinals

(2) Limeira vs. (3) Flamengo 
Game 1

Game 2

Game 3

Finals

(1) Bauru vs. (3) Flamengo
Game 1

Game 2

FIBA Americas League

Preliminary round

Group B

Quarterfinals

Group F

Final Four

Semifinals

Bronze medal game

Season records

Player statistics

NBB regular season 

Updated: August 10, 2016

Notes

On October 1, 2014 Flamengo announced the project to build a multisport arena in the Gávea neighborhood in a partnership with fast food chain McDonald's. The venue will have a capacity up to 4,000 people for basketball, volleyball and futsal events and music shows.

References

External links
Official club website 
Flamengo Team Profile at New Basket Brazil 
Flamengo Team Profile at Latinbasket.com 

Flamengo Basketball seasons
Flamengo Basketball